Carex comosa is a species of sedge known as longhair sedge and bristly sedge. It is native to North America, where it grows in western and eastern regions of Canada and the United States, and parts of Mexico. It grows in wet places, including meadows and many types of wetlands. Tolerates deeper water than most common species and is good for retention basins. This sedge produces clumps of triangular stems up to 100 or 120 centimeters tall from short rhizomes. The inflorescence is up to 35 centimeters long and has a long bract which is longer than the spikes. It is a cluster of several cylindrical spikes. The scales over the fruits taper into long, thin awns.

References

External links
Jepson Manual Treatment
USDA Plants Profile
Flora of North America
Photo gallery

comosa
Flora of North America
Plants described in 1846